Kuhsarak may refer to:
 Kuhsarak-e Olya
 Kuhsarak-e Sofla